July 26 - Eastern Orthodox Church calendar - July 28

All fixed commemorations below are celebrated on August 9 by Old Calendar.{{#tag:ref|The notation Old Style or (OS) is sometimes used to indicate a date in the Julian Calendar (which is used by churches on the "Old Calendar").The notation New Style or (NS), indicates a date in the Revised Julian calendar (which is used by churches on the "New Calendar").|group=note}}

For July 27th, Orthodox Churches on the Old Calendar commemorate the Saints listed on July 14.

Saints
 Holy Great-martyr and Healer Panteleimon (305)Great Synaxaristes:  Ὁ Ἅγιος Παντελεήμων ὁ Μεγαλομάρτυρας καὶ Ἰαματικός. 27 ΙΟΥΛΙΟΥ. ΜΕΓΑΣ ΣΥΝΑΞΑΡΙΣΤΗΣ.Greatmartyr and Healer Panteleimon. OCA - Lives of the Saints. 9 августа (27 июля). Православная Энциклопедия под редакцией Патриарха Московского и всея Руси Кирилла (электронная версия). (Orthodox Encyclopedia - Pravenc.ru).
 The blind man healed by St. Panteleimon and beheaded for Christ (4th century)August 9 / July 27. HOLY TRINITY RUSSIAN ORTHODOX CHURCH (A parish of the Patriarchate of Moscow).
 The Holy 153 Martyrs of Thrace, by drowning.Great Synaxaristes:  Οἱ Ἅγιοι 153 Μάρτυρες ἀπὸ τὴ Θράκη. 27 ΙΟΥΛΙΟΥ. ΜΕΓΑΣ ΣΥΝΑΞΑΡΙΣΤΗΣ.
 Saint Symeon Stylites (the Younger) of Sicily (6th century)
 Venerable Anthousa the Confessor, Abbess of Mantineus Convent,Great Synaxaristes:  Ἡ Ἁγία Ἀνθοῦσα ἡ Ὁμολογήτρια. 27 ΙΟΥΛΙΟΥ. ΜΕΓΑΣ ΣΥΝΑΞΑΡΙΣΤΗΣ. and her 90 monastic sisters (759)Venerable Anthusa, Abbess of Mantinea in Asia Minor, and her 90 sisters. OCA - Lives of the Saints.
 Righteous Manuel, monk.Great Synaxaristes:  Ὁ Ὅσιος Μανουήλ. 27 ΙΟΥΛΙΟΥ. ΜΕΓΑΣ ΣΥΝΑΞΑΡΙΣΤΗΣ.
 Holy Equal-to-the-Apostles Clement of Ochrid, Archbishop of Ochrid (916), Angelarius, Gorazd (Horasdus), Nahum, and Sabbas (9th-10th centuries), of Ochrid, disciples of Saints Cyril and Methodius.  (see also: May 11 and July 17)

Pre-Schism Western saints
 Martyrs Maurus, Pantaleimon and Sergius, under Trajan (c. 117)
 Saints Ecclesius, Bishop of Ravenna in Italy from 52l till 532 (532)
 Saint Etherius, Bishop of Auxerre in France (573)
 Martyrs Aurelius, his wife Sabigotha (Natalia), Felix and his wife Liliosa, and Hieromartyr George the Sabbaïte, Hierodeacon, at Córdoba (852)Rev. Sabine Baring-Gould (M.A.). "SS. AURELIUS, SABAGOTHA (NATALIA), AND OTHERS, MM. (A.D. 852.)." In: The Lives of the Saints. Volume the Eighth: July - Part II. London: John C. Nimmo, 1898. pp. 588-591.

Post-Schism Orthodox saints
 Blessed Nicholas Kochanov, Fool-for-Christ of Novgorod (1392)Blessed Nicholas Kochanov the Fool-For-Christ at Novgorod. OCA - Lives of the Saints.
 Saint Ioasaph of Moscow, Metropolitan of Moscow (1555) ИОАСАФ. Православная Энциклопедия под редакцией Патриарха Московского и всея Руси Кирилла (электронная версия). (Orthodox Encyclopedia - Pravenc.ru).
 New Martyr Christodoulos of Cassandra, at Thessaloniki (1777)

New martyrs and confessors
 New Hieromartyr Ambrose (Gudko), Bishop of Sarapul (1918)
 New Hieromartyrs Platon Gornykh and Panteleimon Bogoyavlensky, Priests (1918)
 New Hieromartyr John Solovyev, Priest (1941) ИОАНН. Православная Энциклопедия под редакцией Патриарха Московского и всея Руси Кирилла (электронная версия). (Orthodox Encyclopedia - Pravenc.ru).

Other commemorations
 Glorification (1970) of St. Herman of Alaska (1836)
 Repose of Abbess Pulcheria of Viatka, Abbess of Nativity Convent (1890)
 Icon of the Most Holy Theotokos of Magadan (1989)

Icon gallery

Notes

References

Sources
 July 27/August 9. Orthodox Calendar (PRAVOSLAVIE.RU).
 August 9 / July 27. HOLY TRINITY RUSSIAN ORTHODOX CHURCH (A parish of the Patriarchate of Moscow).
 July 27. OCA - The Lives of the Saints.
 July 27. The Year of Our Salvation - Holy Transfiguration Monastery, Brookline, Massachusetts. 
 The Autonomous Orthodox Metropolia of Western Europe and the Americas (ROCOR). St. Hilarion Calendar of Saints for the year of our Lord 2004. St. Hilarion Press (Austin, TX). p. 55.
 The Twenty-Seventh Day of the Month of July. Orthodoxy in China.
 July 27. Latin Saints of the Orthodox Patriarchate of Rome.
 The Roman Martyrology. Transl. by the Archbishop of Baltimore. Last Edition, According to the Copy Printed at Rome in 1914. Revised Edition, with the Imprimatur of His Eminence Cardinal Gibbons. Baltimore: John Murphy Company, 1916. p. 222.
 Rev. Richard Stanton. A Menology of England and Wales, or, Brief Memorials of the Ancient British and English Saints Arranged According to the Calendar, Together with the Martyrs of the 16th and 17th Centuries. London: Burns & Oates, 1892. pp. 362–364.

 Greek Sources
 Great Synaxaristes:  27 ΙΟΥΛΙΟΥ. ΜΕΓΑΣ ΣΥΝΑΞΑΡΙΣΤΗΣ.
  Συναξαριστής. 27 Ιουλίου. ECCLESIA.GR. (H ΕΚΚΛΗΣΙΑ ΤΗΣ ΕΛΛΑΔΟΣ). 
  27/07/.'' Ορθόδοξος Συναξαριστής.

 Russian Sources
  9 августа (27 июля). Православная Энциклопедия под редакцией Патриарха Московского и всея Руси Кирилла (электронная версия). (Orthodox Encyclopedia - Pravenc.ru).
  27 июля по старому стилю / 9 августа по новому стилю. СПЖ "Союз православных журналистов". .

July in the Eastern Orthodox calendar